The Tick is an American animated television series adaptation of the New England Comics satirical superhero the Tick. The series aired for three seasons from 1994 to 1996 on the Fox network's Fox Kids block, which introduced the character to a mainstream audience. The Tick has been syndicated by various networks, further increasing the show's cult following, and has been released on both VHS and DVD. A live-action series aired in 2001, with Amazon launching a second live-action series in 2016.

The Tick was also shown on Teletoon in Canada as part of its Toonaholics Anonymous block in 2001 and on Jetix in the United States. The show was aired in the UK on BBC2 at various time slots between 1995 and 1996.

Ownership of the series passed to Disney in 2001 when Disney acquired Fox Kids Worldwide. The series is not available on Disney+. In the United States, the series is currently available on Hulu.

Plot
The Tick is a superhero who underwent the tryouts at the National Super Institute in Reno, Nevada where superheroes who pass will be assigned to the best cities to protect from crime. Upon passing the tryouts, he is assigned to The City where he befriends a former accountant named Arthur whom he takes on as a sidekick.

With the aid of Die Fledermaus, American Maid, Sewer Urchin, and other superheroes, the Tick and Arthur protect The City from bad guys like Chairface Chippendale, Breadmaster, El Seed, the Terror, and others who would harm it.

Cast

Principal voice actors
 Cam Clarke as Die Fledermaus, Fishboy, Johnny Polite
 Townsend Coleman as the Tick, Lava Man, Man-Eating Cow, Eyebrows Mulligan
 Micky Dolenz as Arthur (Season 1), Captain Lemming
 Jess Harnell as Sewer Urchin, Breadmaster, Human Bullet, Mighty Agrippa: Roman God of the Aqueduct, Speak, Sub-Human, Watt
 Kay Lenz as American Maid
 Rob Paulsen as Arthur (Season 2 and Season 3), Brainchild, Crusading Chameleon, Captain Mucilage, the Forehead, the Terror

Notable additional voice cast
 Phil Austin as Wally, Two-Eyed Jack
 Mary Kay Bergman as Ants, Ottoman, Secretary
 Hamilton Camp as Professor Chromedome, Benjamin Franklin
 Jim Cummings as Barry Hubris, Captain Decency, Mr. Mental, Multiple Santa, Stalingrad, Thrakkorzog, Leonardo da Vinci, Attila the Hun
 Ron Feinberg as Omnipotus, Mayor
 Pat Fraley as the Carpeted Man, the Crease (2nd Time), Mayor Blank, Dyna-Mole, Eastern-Bloc Robot Cowboy, Stalingrad, the Visual Eye, Whirling Scottish Devil, Zipperneck
 Brad Garrett as Jim Rage, Inquisitor
 Ed Gilbert as Bi-Polar Bear, El Seed, Idea Man, Indigestible Man, Johannes Gutenberg
 Jennifer Hale as Carmelita Vatos
 Dorian Harewood as Pineapple Pokopo, Taft, George Washington Carver
 Tony Jay as Chairface Chippendale
 Maurice LaMarche as Doorman, the Deadly Bulb/Pigleg, the Evil Midnight Bomber What Bombs at Midnight, Fin, Hotel Manager, the Human Ton, Handy
 Danny Mann as Dinosaur Neil, Tongue Tongue, Mr. Exciting, Bellbot, Dr. Mung Mung
 Roddy McDowell as the Breadmaster
 Pat Musick as the Bee Twins, Mad Nanny, Tuun-La
 Phil Proctor as Courderoy Cordoba, Fortissimo Brothers, Charles' Father
 Kimmy Robertson as Dot
 Roger Rose as Four-Legged Man, Skippy, Brian Pinhead
 Kevin Schon as the Red Herring, Baby Boomerangutan, Big Shot, the Crease, Feral Boy, Jack Tuber: Man of a Thousand Faces, the Living Doll, Plunger Man, Proto Clown, Uncle Creamy II

Crew
 Susan Blu – Voice Director
 Art Vitello – Voice Director (Season 1; Episodes 7-13)

Development and production
While still in college, Tick creator Ben Edlund was producing his independent comic book series The Tick based on the character. He was eventually approached by Kiscom, a small, New Jersey-based toy licensing and design company. Kiscom wanted to merchandise the Tick. Major TV networks and studios were reluctant to take on an animated series based on the absurd character. Kiscom stayed in touch with Edlund and finally Sunbow Entertainment, the small, New York-based animation company that created The Transformers, G.I. Joe, and The Mask, paired him up with writer Richard Liebmann-Smith. Neither had any experience in animation or television, but for two months they worked vigorously on the first episode of The Tick. Neither man held high esteem for their final script, and their feelings were validated when FOX turned down the first pitch. They were given one more chance to refine it in five days. Over one weekend, they worked "instinctively" with little sleep and ended up satisfying FOX. Edlund later reflected, "We kind of defined in one weekend exactly where the show went for that first season, which was cool."

While some darker characters and sexual innuendo seen in the comic series would be removed for its animated counterpart, Sunbow's Tick series would hold to its satirical roots. Writing duties were also given to Christopher McCulloch who had met Edlund prior to their television work and wrote several issues of the Tick comic book series. They would much later work together on McCulloch's Adult Swim series, The Venture Bros.. Edlund, a co-producer of The Tick, remained very hands-on during production, causing delays. According to Edlund:

The Tick finally premiered on September 10, 1994 and was a success. Edlund later expressed his view that, because the series did not reach the commercial heights of Teenage Mutant Ninja Turtles, its merchandising success deteriorated by the end of its first season. However, he admitted "That's essentially good as far as I'm concerned; although, I would be much more wealthy at this point. That failure, to me, makes The Tick a much more sincere proposal."

Rather than being an asylum escapee, as portrayed in the Tick comic book series, the animated version of the Tick crashes a superhero convention to win the "protectorship" of The City. With its emphasis on superhero parody, The Tick became a Saturday morning staple during the Fox Kids block. Its title character was voiced by Townsend Coleman and his sidekick, Arthur, by Micky Dolenz for Season 1. Rob Paulsen took over the latter role for Seasons 2 and 3. The series also features exclusive allies to the Tick like Die Fledermaus, a shallow, self-absorbed Batman parody; Sewer Urchin, a sea urchin-themed Aquaman parody who resembles Dustin Hoffman's character in Rain Man; and American Maid, a more noble superheroine featuring aspects of Wonder Woman and Captain America.

The show's opening theme, written by Doug Katsaros, who also composed the scores for every episode, consists of big band music and campy scat singing. A typical episode plot would have the Tick battling a villain until Arthur devises a solution that saves the day. The Tick then declares an absurd moral regarding the previous conflict before the story comes to a close. Although the series was initially aimed primarily at children, it features an absurdist style that appeals to an older audience as well.

After three seasons, The Tick final episode aired November 24, 1996. The following year, FOX began talks with Sunbow Entertainment about producing a prime time Tick special, but this never came to fruition. Comedy Central syndicated The Tick during this time and subsequently helped make it a cult hit with adults. In May 2000, the pilot episode for a live action series of The Tick was completed. FOX attempted to capitalize on the growing adult fan base by introducing this new incarnation in November 2001, but the series could not match the success of its animated predecessor.

In June 2005, Toon Disney began airing The Tick along with other former FOX animated series like X-Men. It would also occasionally air on ABC Family as part of the Jetix cartoon block.

Episodes

Series overview

Season 1 (1994–95)

Season 2 (1995–96)

Season 3 (1996)

Home media
The first two episodes of The Tick, as well as Season 3's "The Tick vs Arthur," were released on VHS in 1995 and 1998 by 20th Century Fox Home Entertainment though the Fox Kids Video label.

On August 29, 2006, Buena Vista Home Entertainment released the first season of The Tick on DVD as The Tick vs. Season One. This collection contains only 12 of the 13 episodes. On May 31, 2006, Disney released the following statement regarding the missing episode: "Due to licensing problems, episode #11 ("The Tick vs. The Mole Men") is not included. However, we hope to include it in future DVD releases of The Tick". The UK edition of the first season, released the following year, presented all 13 episodes.

The second season of The Tick, titled The Tick vs. Season Two, was released on August 7, 2007.  This DVD release is not the complete set, however, as it is missing the episode "Alone Together." This episode features Omnipotus, a parody of Galactus (though earlier episodes used similar comic book parodies, and are available on the DVD releases). In the August 6, 2006 entry of his blog, Christopher McCulloch, the writer for all of the omitted episodes, states that he does not know the reason for the exclusion of episode #11 from the Season 1 DVD. The UK edition contains all 13 season 2 episodes.

In the UK, Liberation Entertainment Ltd. released all three seasons, complete with no missing episodes and all presented uncut and unedited.

Reception

Critical response
During its original run, The Tick was nominated for several Annie Awards as well as Emmys and, in 1995, won two of the former. In March 2008, Wizard magazine ranked The Tick #16 on its Top 100 Greatest Cartoons. In January 2009, IGN ranked The Tick #6 on its Top 100 Animated Series list. IGN went on to regard it "the first great lampooning of the superhero genre" and compared the series to Mel Brooks and Monty Python. On Rotten Tomatoes, The Tick has an aggregate score of 100% based on 8 critic reviews.

Awards and nominations

Annie Awards

Daytime Emmy Awards

Merchandising

While the Tick comic book series included some extras, such as trading cards, merchandising of The Tick increased dramatically with the launch of the animated series.  Action figures, pogs, T-shirts, hats, party favors, costumes, and a board game were representative.  In addition, many fast food restaurant chains such as Carl's Jr. and Taco Bell offered Tick-related give-aways.

Fox Interactive also published a beat 'em up Tick-based video game and released it on the Super NES and Sega Genesis. The game was criticized for having very long stages with large amounts of enemies and a nonsensical ending.

In 1997, the year following the series' end, Greg Hyland's The Tick: Mighty Blue Justice! was published as a tie-in with the series.

References

Sources
 The Tick Official Website for The Tick cartoon
 The Tick: Circus Maximus, NEC Comics, 2004.
 The Tick: Mighty Blue Justice!, Hyland, Greg, Berkley Boulevard Books, New York, 1997

External links

  at Comedy Central
  at Fox Kids
 
 The Tick at TheTVDB.com

TV 1994
1994 American television series debuts
1996 American television series endings
1990s American animated television series
1990s American satirical television series
1990s American superhero comedy television series
American superhero comedy television series
American children's animated comedy television series
American children's animated superhero television series
Animated satirical television series
English-language television shows
Fox Kids
Fox Broadcasting Company original programming
Television series by 20th Century Fox Television
Television series by Fox Television Animation
Television series by Saban Entertainment
Television series by Sunbow Entertainment
Television shows based on comics